Bukas, Babaha ng Dugo is 2001 Filipino action crime drama film written and directed by Baldo Marro for Regal Films and starring Lito Lapid and Emilio Garcia.

Plot
An honest soldier (Lito Lapid) is assigned to a unit comprising several men who, unknown to him, are under the charge of his rival (Emilio Garcia).  Despite his protests, the group plans a heist. They ambush a robbery gang that had just themselves done a bank robbery, and as assurance, they killed the pursuing police officers. They mauled the soldier and threw him out of the vehicle so that he will be framed, and he was indeed captured and imprisoned.

The group's leader had been lusting after the soldier's wife, and so raids her house, not only raping and killing the wife, but also brutally raping and killing the soldier's younger sister. Luckily his daughter escaped the fracas and was hidden by her grandfather.

When the wrongly imprisoned soldier received the bad news, he escaped prison. Just in time, because while his father was killed by the group, the soldier saved his daughter, but was grievously wounded. They found shelter in the hut of  a woman and her mother's, where he planned his revenge.

He eliminated his former group mates, firstly, the group who mauled him and then his own partner (Efren Reyes, Jr.) who betrayed him. The leader caught wind of his track and fights him on the river, leading to his death.

Cast
 Lito Lapid
 Emilio Garcia
 Efren Reyes, Jr.
 Via Veloso
 Sharla Tolentino

Reception

References

External links
 Bukas, Babaha ng Dugo at the Internet Movie Database

Philippine crime drama films